Palmares may refer to:

Palmares, Pernambuco, a municipality in the state of Pernambuco in Brazil
Palmares Paulista
Palmares (canton), a canton in the province of Alajuela in Costa Rica
Palmares de Alajuela, a city and district in the canton of Palmares in the province of Alajuela in Costa Rica
Palmarès, the list of accomplishments in sport
Palmares (quilombo), powerful quilombo located in Brazil and destroyed by Portuguese artillery in 1694
Palmares River
Palmares, a 2021 novel by Gayl Jones
Zumbi dos Palmares International Airport

See also
 Palmar (disambiguation)